The 1948 SFR Yugoslavia Chess Championship was the 4th edition of SFR Yugoslav Chess Championship. Held in Belgrade, SFR Yugoslavia, SR Serbia. The tournament was won by Svetozar Gligorić and Vasja Pirc.

Table and results

References 

Yugoslav Chess Championships
1948 in chess
Chess